The 1999 Southern Miss Golden Eagles football team represented the University of Southern Mississippi in the 1999 NCAA Division I-A football season. The Golden Eagles were led by head coach Jeff Bower and played their home games at M. M. Roberts Stadium. They secured their third Conference USA conference championship after finishing 6–0 in conference play. Their overall record was 9–3, and they were invited to play in the 1999 Liberty Bowl, where they defeated Colorado State, 23–17. In the final AP Poll of the year, the Golden Eagles were ranked 14th, which is to date the highest finish in school history.

Schedule

Roster

References

Southern Miss
Southern Miss Golden Eagles football seasons
Conference USA football champion seasons
Liberty Bowl champion seasons
Southern Miss Golden Eagles football